Esther de Pommery (was born in Bern) – Countess of Lambrey,  is a Swiss activist, founder of Esther de Pommery Comtesse de Lambrey Foundation. She studied obstetrics at the University of Bern and archaeology in the University of Paris. She speaks English, German, French and Italian.

Organizations
 Esther de Pommery Comtesse de Lambrey Foundation, Switzerland
 Former ambassador of Red Cross (Eyesight)
 Former ambassador of the Helping Hand Coalition, Israel
 Former ambassador of Yad Sarah, Jerusalem, Israel
 Former member of the board of directors of The European Fine Art Foundations, Monte Carlo 
 Former member of the board of directors of World Youth Talent, founded by Roger Moore 
 Former member of the UNESCO Arts of Culture Committee, Paris
 Former member of the board of trustees University of Basle 
 Former patronage of various music and dance schools (Bucharest, Sofia, Klusch)
 Honorary doctorate by International Medical Association of Bulgaria, Varna 
 Former honorary chairperson for Romanian Relief Efforts, Basle, Switzerland
 Former director of the annual charity Christmas concert of the City of Basle 
 Former music management for dancers, CID, Athens 
 Former researching for dance in African cultures
 Former member of the International Committee to the Rector Sojza University
 Humanitarian efforts for Bulgaria 
 Honorary membership of two cities in Romania, Anina and Bucharest
 New hospital, Esther de Pommery" was built in Montana, Bulgaria
 Former member of Flying Doctors" for Nigeria 
 Former president of the new founded Israel to the Nations" 
 Former CO of the Ombudsman Bulgaria, patron of Human Rights

Honours (awards, distinctions)
 Humanitarians GO & NGO
 Member of the UNESCO.
 Honorary doctorate international
 Member of "Flying Doctors" Nigeria.
 New hospital "Esther de Pommery" built in Montana, Bulgaria, by King Simeon, prime minister of Bulgaria.
 Member of the board of trustees University of Basle, Switzerland.

References

External links
 Official blog Countess-Esther de Pommery facebook.com

Living people
People from Bern
Swiss gynaecologists
Women gynaecologists
Swiss archaeologists
Swiss women archaeologists
Swiss activists
Swiss women activists
Swiss women physicians
20th-century Swiss physicians
21st-century Swiss physicians
Year of birth missing (living people)